r/changemyview, also known as Change My View (CMV), is a subreddit where participants discuss various topics for the purpose of understanding opposing viewpoints. Topics discussed include politics, media, and popular culture.

Format
Users submit posts containing an opinion of theirs, and respondents to each post attempt to change the poster's views on that matter. Submitters must reply to these challenges in three hours or less, resulting in debate over the topic. If their view is changed, they can award a delta symbol (∆) to a commenter.

Rules for the community include that people should explain their reason, focus on the argument, and be civil.

History
The forum was established by Kal Turnbull, a Scottish musician, in 2013; he was 17 years old at the time. He came up with the idea after noticing that everyone in his friend group all shared similar views, leading him to wonder how one could easily come across opposing viewpoints. Less than a year after its founding, the subreddit gained 100,000 members.

In 2019, Turnbull started his own site based on the concept, called ChangeAView.

Reception
Tesla CEO Elon Musk commented on the "change my view" format that the people who ought to have the greatest need for it are also the least likely to be open to other views. 

Conversations from the subreddit have been the subject of research on interaction dynamics.

References

External links

Subreddits
Internet properties established in 2013